"Shine a Light" is a song released by English rock band the Rolling Stones on their 1972 album Exile on Main St. It was written about founding band member Brian Jones and was subsequently reworked and released following his death in 1969.

Background
Although credited to usual Stones writers Mick Jagger and Keith Richards, "Shine a Light" was largely a Mick Jagger – Leon Russell composition. Jagger began writing the song in early 1968 when the Stones still had guitarist Brian Jones as a member. The song was originally titled "Get a Line on You" and dealt with Jones's ever-worsening addiction to drugs and his detachment from the rest of the band.

A version of the song, under the title "(Can't Seem To) Get a Line on You," was made by Leon Russell at Olympic Studios in October 1969 with assistance from Jagger (lead vocals), Charlie Watts (drums), Leon Russell (piano), and probably also Bill Wyman (bass) and Keith Richards (guitar). The recording was made during the recording sessions for the album Leon Russell (released 1970), where Watts and Wyman contributed drums and bass to some of the tracks. However, the song was shelved until 1993, when it finally surfaced as a bonus track on the 24K gold re-release by DCC Compact Classics (DCC Compact Classics GZS 1049).

After Jones's death in 1969, the song resurfaced. Following revisions by Jagger, it was recorded again in July 1970 as "Shine a Light". A third recording at London's Olympic Sound Studios in December 1971 resulted in the final version of the song released on Exile on Main St.

This final version featured Jagger on vocals, Stones producer Jimmy Miller on drums instead of Watts, and Mick Taylor on electric guitar and bass guitar.

According to Wyman, he played bass on the song and Taylor was erroneously credited with playing bass, having pointed out the error via an advance copy of the album. He also says that he played bass on more tracks than was specified in the album's credits and that Jagger had gotten the credits wrong. Also performing on the song are back-up singers Clydie King, Joe Greene, Venetta Fields and Jesse Kirkland. Billy Preston performs both piano and organ for the recording and had a distinct influence on Jagger and the song while mixing the album at Los Angeles' Sunset Sound Studios. Jagger claims visits to Preston's local church inspired the gospel influences apparent on the final recording while Richards was absent from these sessions. An alternative version without the backing singers and with a different guitar solo by Mick Taylor was released on bootlegs.

Legal problems
After the release of Exile on Main St., Allen Klein sued the Rolling Stones for breach of settlement because "Shine a Light" and four other songs on the album were composed while Jagger and Richards were under contract with his company, ABKCO. ABKCO acquired publishing rights to the songs, giving it a share of the royalties from Exile on Main St., and was able to publish another album of previously released Rolling Stones songs, More Hot Rocks (Big Hits & Fazed Cookies).

Live
"Shine a Light" first entered the Stones' setlist during the 1995 leg of the Voodoo Lounge Tour, and live performances of the song from this period were included on the 1995 album Stripped and its 2016 edition Totally Stripped. The Stones played the song occasionally during their Bridges to Babylon Tour (1997–98) and A Bigger Bang Tour (2005-07).  The song gave its name to a 2008 Martin Scorsese film chronicling the Stones' Beacon Theatre performances on the latter tour, and the 29 October 2006 performance is included on the soundtrack album.

Legacy
The song's vocal melody was an influence on Oasis's song "Live Forever", released in 1994. The song has been covered multiple times in concert by Phish, the first time on 31 October 2009 when the band covered the entirety of Exile on Main Street as part of its musical costume. Elton John also performed the song live for 'Peace One Day' on 21 September 2012, and is a well-known Stones fan. The song was also featured in the 3rd episode season 6 of Californication "Dead Rockstars" performed by Tim Minchin (aka Atticus Fetch in the series) The song is played in its entirety beginning in the last scenes and through the credits in ‘Ray Donovan, the Movie.

References

The Rolling Stones songs
1972 songs
Songs written by Jagger–Richards
Song recordings produced by Jimmy Miller